Allen, Allen, Allen & Allen is a United States law firm in Richmond, Virginia. It was founded in 1910 in Lunenburg County, Virginia, by George E. Allen Sr. The firm is the oldest and largest personal injury law firm in Virginia. It has seven offices in Virginia, in Richmond, Charlottesville, Chesterfield, Fredericksburg, Mechanicsville, Petersburg, and Stafford.

History 

In 1951 Allen & Allen represented the plaintiffs in Mahone v. Ford Motor Company.

In February 2009, Coleman Allen, Jr., a trial lawyer with the firm, was co-signer with Rodney A. Smolla for Vicki Iseman of the public statement released upon Ms. Iseman's settlement (without cash) of her defamation suit against The New York Times. Ms. Iseman had sued over coverage of her part in the John McCain lobbyist controversy, during Sen. McCain's  2008 presidential campaign. The statement rested much of the case on whether Ms. Iseman was a private citizen or public figure in the situation, with her lawyers arguing for her rights as a private citizen.

References

Law firms established in 1910
Law firms based in Richmond, Virginia